Malye Gorki is a rural locality (a village) in Nagornoye Rural Settlement, Petushinsky District, Vladimir Oblast, Russia. The population was 11 as of 2010.

Geography 
Malye Gorki is located 35 km northwest of Petushki (the district's administrative centre) by road. Bolshiye Gorki is the nearest rural locality.

References 

Rural localities in Petushinsky District